The 1997 Girls' Youth European Volleyball Championship was the 2nd edition of the competition, with the main phase (contested between 8 teams) held in Slovakia from 25 to 30 March 1997.

Venues

Preliminary round

Pool I

|}

|}

Pool II

|}

|}

5th–8th classification

5th–8th Semifinals

|}

7th place match

|}

5th place match

|}

Final round

Semifinals

|}

3rd place match

|}

Final

|}

Final standing

Individual awards
Most Valuable Player:

References

Girls' Youth European Volleyball Championship
Europe
Volley
International volleyball competitions hosted by Slovakia